Aniela Tułodziecka (2 October 1853 in Dąbrowa Stara - 11 October 1932 in Poznań) was a Polish educational activist of the Warta Society (Towarzystwo Przyjaciół Wzajemnego Pouczania się i Opieki nad Dziećmi Warta).

References 

 Witold Jakóbczyk, Przetrwać na Wartą 1815-1914, Dzieje narodu i państwa polskiego, vol. III-55, Krajowa Agencja Wydawnicza, Warszawa 1989

1853 births
1932 deaths
People from Wolsztyn County
Polish activists
Education activists
Officers of the Order of Polonia Restituta
People from the Province of Posen